Victor Edward Jurusz Jr. (September 26, 1953 – December 31, 2019), known professionally as Vic Juris, was an American jazz guitarist.

Music career 
Juris was born in Jersey City, New Jersey, but he moved with his family to Parsippany early in his life.  In 1963, at the age of 10, he began learning guitar. At 11, he studied guitar at the home of his teacher, Ed Berg, and got interested in jazz listening to Berg's records of guitarists Django Reinhardt, Jim Hall, Barney Kessel, Jimmy Raney, and Johnny Smith. In his teens he played the rock music of the 1960s. When he was 19, he met blind saxophonist Eric Kloss and they became friends. He made his first recording on Kloss's album Bodies' Warmth (Muse, 1975). Around the same time, he met guitarist Pat Martino, who became a friend and mentor.

Juris recorded with Richie Cole during 1976–78 and released his debut album as a leader, Roadsong, in 1979. In the early 1980s, he turned to acoustic guitar in duos with Larry Coryell and Biréli Lagrène, and in the late 1980s he worked with Gary Peacock's band. Since 1991 he has spent much of his career with saxophonist David Liebman.

During the 1990s, he worked as sideman with Lee Konitz and Peggy Stern (1992), Benny Waters (1993), Jeanie Bryson (1993–94), Gary Peacock (since 1994), Steve LaSpina (since 1995), Judi Silvano (1996), Ken Serio (1996, 2007,2019) and Joe Locke (1998).

Juris taught at The New School for Jazz and Contemporary Music, Lehigh University, and Rutgers University and wrote instructional books for guitar.

Discography

As leader
 Roadsong (Muse, 1978)
 Horizon Drive (Muse, 1980)
 Bleecker Street (Muse, 1982)
 Bohemia with John Etheridge (Jazzpoint, 1988)
 For the Music (Jazzpoint, 1992)
 Night Tripper (SteepleChase, 1995)
 Music of Alec Wilder (Double-Time, 1996)
 Pastels (SteepleChase, 1996)
 Moonscape (SteepleChase, 1997)
 Remembering Eric Dolphy (SteepleChase, 1999)
 Songbook (SteepleChase, 2000)
 Songbook 2 (SteepleChase, 2002)
 Journey with Giuseppe Continenza (Jardis, 2003)
Seven Steps To Heaven with Giuseppe Continenza, Dominique Di Piazza and Pietro Iodice (Wide Sound, 2003) 
 While My Guitar Gently Weeps (SteepleChase, 2004)
 Blue Horizon (Zoho, 2004)
 A Second Look (Mel Bay, 2005)
 Jazz Hits Vol. 1 with MB3 (Mel Bay, 2006)
 Omega Is the Alpha (SteepleChase, 2010)
 Listen Here (SteepleChase, 2011)
 Free Admission (SteepleChase, 2012)
 Walking On Water (SteepleChase, 2014)
 Blue (SteepleChase, 2015)
 Vic Juris Plays Victor Young (SteepleChase, 2016)
 Eye Contact (SteepleChase, 2018)
 Let's Cool One (SteepleChase, 2020)

As sideman
With Richie Cole
 New York Afternoon (Muse, 1977)
 Alto Madness (Muse, 1978)
 Keeper of the Flame (Muse, 1979)
 Pure Imagination (Concord Jazz, 1987)
 Signature (Milestone, 1988)
 Kush (Heads Up, 1995)
 West Side Story (Venus, 1996)
 Trenton Style (Alto Madness Music, 1999)

With Bireli Lagrene
 Live (Jazzpoint, 1985)
 Live at Carnegie Hall (Jazzpoint, 1993)
 A Tribute to Django Reinhardt (Jazzpoint, 1999)

With Steve LaSpina
 When I'm Alone (SteepleChase, 1995)
 Story Time (SteepleChase, 1996)
 When Children Smile (SteepleChase, 1997)
 The Bounce (SteepleChase, 2000)
 Remember When (SteepleChase, 2003)

With Dave Liebman
 Classic Ballads (Candid, 1991)
 Turn It Around (Owl, 1992)
 Miles Away (Owl, 1995)
 Songs for My Daughter (Soul Note, 1995)
 Voyage (Evidence, 1996)
 John Coltrane's Meditations (Arkadia Jazz, 1997)
 New Vista (Arkadia Jazz, 1997)
 Liebman Plays Puccini (Arkadia Jazz, 2001)
 The Unknown Jobim (Global Music Network, 2001)
 Beyond the Line (OmniTone, 2003)
 Conversation (Sunnyside, 2003)
 In a Mellow Tone (Zoho, 2004)
 Back On the Corner (Tone Center, 2006)
 Blues All Ways (OmniTone, 2007)
 Further Conversations (Azul Music, 2008)
 Live at MCG (MCG 2009)
 Live/As Always (Mama, 2010)
 Turnaround (Jazzwerkstatt, 2010)
 Lineage (Whaling City Sound, 2013)

With others
 David Amram, Live at Musikfest! (New Chamber Music, 1990)
 David Amram, On the Waterfront On Broadway (Varese Sarabande, 1995)
 Jamie Baum, Undercurrents (Konnex, 1992)
 Jeanie Bryson, I Love Being Here with You (Telarc, 1993)
 Jeanie Bryson, Tonight I Need You So (Telarc, 1994)
 Frank Catalano & Jimmy Chamberlin, Tokyo No. 9 (Ropeadope, 2017)
 Marc Copland & Vic Juris, Double Play (SteepleChase, 2001)
 Stanley Cowell, Welcome to This New World (SteepleChase, 2013)
 Giacomo Gates, Centerpiece (Origin, 2004)
 Bill Goodwin, Network (Omnisound, 1982)
 Bill Goodwin, Three Is a Crowd (TCB, 1994)
 Tim Hagans, The Moon Is Waiting (Palmetto, 2011)
 Jack Kerouac & David Amram, Pull My Daisy...and Other Jazz Classics (Premier, 1995)
 Jack Kerouac, Jack Kerouac Reads On the Road (Rykodisc, 1999)
 Eric Kloss, Bodies' Warmth (Muse, 1975)
 Lee Konitz & Peggy Stern, Lunasea (Soul Note, 1992)
 Joe Locke, Slander and Other Love Songs (Milestone, 1998)
 Charlie Mariano, Savannah Samurai (Jazzline, 1998)
 Barry Miles, Sky Train (RCA Victor, 1977)
 Barry Miles, Fusion Is... (Century, 1978)
 Don Patterson, Movin' Up! (Muse, 1977)
 Deepak Ram, Steps Golden Horn (GHP, 2008)
 Rufus Reid, Quiet Pride (Motema, 2013)
 Judi Silvano, Vocalise (Blue Note, 1997)
 Judi Silvano, Songs I Wrote or Wish I Did (JSL, 2000)
 Loren Stillman, The Brothers' Breakfast (SteepleChase, 2006)
 Brian Torff, Hitchhiker of Karoo (Quade, 1987)
 Mel Torme, A New Album (Gryphon, 1980)
 Mel Torme, The London Sessions (DCC, 1990)
 Roseanna Vitro, Passion Dance (Telarc, 1996)
 Benny Waters, Plays Songs of Love (Jazzpoint, 1993)
 Phil Woods, Songs Two (Philology, 2015)

References 

1953 births
2019 deaths
American jazz guitarists
Guitarists from New Jersey
Musicians from Jersey City, New Jersey
SteepleChase Records artists
Zoho Music artists
20th-century American guitarists
Muse Records albums
Double-Time Records artists
Deaths from liver cancer